Urban okrug may refer to:
a type of municipal divisions of Russia
a type of administrative divisions of Russia